Armenian State Institute of Physical Culture and Sport is a higher educational institution institute, located in Yerevan, Armenia. It was founded in 1945 and prepares coached, sport journalists, and specialists in the field of health improving physical culture kinesiology and adaptive physical culture. The graduates are awarded a diploma, which is a state-authorized document asserting the higher education completion for state agencies.

Faculties/department

Adaptive physical culture
Athletics
Basketball
Boxing
Chess
Fencing
Football
Free-style wrestling
Graeco-Roman wrestling
Gymnastics
Handball
Heavy athletics
Judo
Кaratedo
Кinesiology
Salvage operations
Skates and cycle racing
Sports dances
Sports journalism
Sports pedagogical
Swimming
Table tennis
Unarmed self-defence
Volleyball

Notable alumni

Levon Aronian, chess Grandmaster
Karen Asrian, chess Grandmaster and Olympic champion
Aghvan Chatinyan, mountain climber
Aleksandr Kabanov, Russian water polo player and coach
Ashot Nadanian, chess International Master, theoretician and coach
Vazgen Sargsyan, former Prime Minister of Armenia
Gagik Tsarukyan, Armenian businessman, current head of the Armenian Olympic Committee
Arsen Yegiazarian, chess Grandmaster and coach

See also
 American University of Armenia
 Armenian State Pedagogical University
 Eurasia International University
 Russian-Armenian (Slavonic) University
 State Engineering University of Armenia
 Yerevan State University
 Yerevan State Linguistic University
 Yerevan State Medical University
 Yerevan State Musical Conservatory

External links
 ASIPC official site 
 Information at Spyur.am
 Armenian State Institute of Physical Culture Education.am

Universities in Armenia
Universities and institutes established in the Soviet Union
Educational institutions established in 1945
Education in Yerevan
Sport in Armenia
1945 establishments in the Soviet Union